Dragonfly Summer is a smooth vocal jazz album by American singer-songwriter and musician Michael Franks. It was released in 1993 with Reprise, and was Franks' twelfth studio album, with no fewer than five producers.

Track listing

Personnel

Musicians
 Michael Franksvocals, guitar, banjo
 Marvin Stammtrumpet, flugelhorn
 Bob Mintzersoprano saxophone, tenor saxophone
 Dave Kozalto saxophone
 Lawrence Feldman, Harvey Estrinflute, recorder
 Paul Jackson Jr., Steve Khan, Toninho Hortaguitar
 Jeff Lorber, Russell Ferrante, Gil Goldsteinkeyboards
 Jimmy Haslip bass
 John Robinson, William Kennedydrums
 Mino Cinelu, Paulinho Da Costapercussion
 Olivia Koppell, Karen Krefus, Ronald Carbone, Harold Colettaviola
 Nathan Stutch, Jesse Levy, Richard Locker, Charles McCrackencello
 Peggy Leeguest vocals
 Dan Hicksguest vocals "Keeping My Eye On You"
 Lamar Alsop, Amanuel Vardi, Lance Hoppen, Eric Benet Jordan, John Hallbackground vocals

Support
 Jeff Lorber, James Farber, Thomas Markengineers
 Jeff Lorber, Gil Goldsteinarrangement
 Recorded at Bearsville Studios, JHL Studio, Oceanway Studios, Skyline Studios Soundcheck Studio.

Reception

Music critic Alex Henderson had mixed feelings for the album, writing in AllMusic that it "isn't one of the pop/jazz singer's better albums, but it has its moments." He was critical of Peggy Lee's duet in "You Were Meant for Me", but thought highly of the "String of Pearls" and "Monk's New Tune" tracks produced by The Yellowjackets.

Stanton was more positive for his review on Audioholics, commenting that "Michael Franks was in top form for this release: catchy, cynical lyrics and great music from great musicians."

References

Bibliography

Michael Franks (musician) albums
1993 albums
Reprise Records albums